Francisco Cases Andreu Born Orihuela, Spain on 23 October 1944 is a retired Spanish Roman Catholic prelate. He is bishop emeritus of the Diocese of Canarias in the Canary Islands (covering the islands of Gran Canaria, Lanzarote and  Fuerteventura). Previously he served as Auxiliary bishop of Orihuela and titular bishop of Timici and as the ordinary of Albacete.

Biography
Cases was born in Orihuela, Spain on 23 October 1944, he studied for the priesthood in the Seminario de San Miguel, in Orihuela. being ordained on 14 April 1968.  Pope John Paul II appointed him auxiliary bishop of Orihuela and titular bishop of Timici (Algeria), he was consecrated on 10 April 1994 by Archbishop Mario Tagliaferri.  He was subsequently appointed bishop of Albacete on 31 August 1996 and of Canarias on 26 November 2005 by Pope Benedict XVI.  As is obligatory upon reaching retirement age, he tendered his resignation to Pope Francis who accepted this on 6 July 2020.

See also
 Diocese of Canarias
 Diocese of Tenerife (the remaining Canary Islands)

References

Spanish Roman Catholic bishops
Bishops appointed by Pope John Paul II
1944 births
Living people